The Nebraska Bankers Association (NBA) is a professional trade association for banks in Nebraska. Its headquarters are in the state's capital city of Lincoln. The NBA was founded in 1890.

Leadership
The president and CEO of the NBA is Richard J. Baier.

External links 
Nebraska Bankers Association

References 

Trade associations based in the United States
Bankers associations